Monterey Car Week is a week in August in which a number of car-related events are held in and around Monterey, California.

Pebble Beach Concours d'Elegance

The Pebble Beach Concours d'Elegance is held on the final Sunday of Monterey Car Week. It is a car show showing the most elegant and notable vehicles in the world. The proceeds of the show support charities.

Rolex Monterey Motorsports Reunion

The Rolex Monterey Motorsports Reunion, formerly known as the Monterey Historics until 2010, is held the final weekend of Monterey Car Week at WeatherTech Raceway Laguna Seca. The four-day event has over 500 participants, and generally features a specific marque every year. The Monterey Pre-Reunion is a two-day event held the previous Saturday and Sunday.

Auctions
Automobile auctions of classic cars are held at various times and locations on the Monterey Peninsula. They are held by auction houses such as Bonhams, RM Auctions, Russo and Steele, Gooding & Company, Mecum Auctions, and Rick Cole Auctions. Total sales in 2014 were $463,744,226, with the high sale being a 1962 Ferrari 250 GTO berlinetta for $38,115,000.

Jet Center Party
The Jet Center Party, formally called the Motorworks Revival, is an invitation-only event held at the Monterey Jet Center the Wednesday before the Pebble Beach Concours. It is considered the unofficial kick-off for the week. It is hosted by Gordon McCall. Both exotic cars and private jets are displayed.

Legends of the Autobahn
The Legends of the Autobahn show features German automobiles. It began as a BMW Car Club of America event and grew to include all German cars. It formerly showed Porsches also, but a separate event, the Porsche Werks Reunion, for Porsches was established in 2014. This event is free to the public. It is held at the Nicklaus Club - Monterey golf club.

Porsche Werks Reunion
The Porsche Werks Reunion event features Porsches and was established in 2014 after splitting off from the Legends of the Autobahn show. There were 519 cars on display at the initial event. This event was started by the Porsche Club of America. It is held at the Rancho Cañada Golf Club in Carmel Valley.

The Quail, A Motorsports Gathering
The Quail, A Motorsports Gathering (usually shortened to The Quail) is a car show limited to 200 automobiles located at the Quail Lodge & Golf Club. A maximum 3,000 tickets are sold to this event to avoid crowding.  Judging includes a Best of Show award, which qualifies the winning vehicle to participate in the Peninsula “Best of the Best” competition which pits the eight best of show cars from eight different premier automobile concours from around the world in one event which takes place in Paris, France.

Concorso Italiano
The Concorso Italiano features Italian cars. It is held at the golf course at the Bayonet & Blackhorse Golf Club.

References

External links
SeeMonterey.com/CarWeek

Annual events in California
Automotive events
Tourist attractions in Monterey County, California